Hilfe! Hochzeit! – Die schlimmste Woche meines Lebens is a German comedy television series directed by Isabel Kleefeld. It is based on the BBC series The Worst Week of My Life and was first broadcast on 13 April 2007 by the television channel Sat.1.

The programme stars celebrated comedy actor Christoph Maria Herbst as Joachim Witte and was produced by Brainpool.

Cast
 Christoph Maria Herbst as Joachim Witte
 Ulrike C. Tscharre as Anna von Schanz
 Uwe Friedrichsen as Albrecht von Schanz
 Peggy Lukac as Sophia von Schanz

See also
List of German television series

External links
 

2007 German television series debuts
2007 German television series endings
German-language television shows
Sat.1 original programming
German television series based on British television series